The Barrancas River is a river in western Argentina. Traveling eastward from the Andes range, it separates the Argentine provinces of Mendoza and Neuquén. Joining the Río Grande, it merges into the Colorado, and flows into the Atlantic Ocean.

See also
List of rivers of Argentina

References
 Rand McNally, The New International Atlas, 1993.
  GEOnet Names Server 

Rivers of Mendoza Province
Rivers of Neuquén Province
Rivers of Argentina